{{Speciesbox
| image = Pleurotus cystidiosus 144580000.jpg
| image_caption = Anamorphic state of P. cystidiosus
| genus = Pleurotus
| species = cystidiosus
| authority = O.K. Mill. 
| synonyms = 'Pleurotus cystidiosus (Y.H. Han, K.M. Chen & S. Cheng) O. Hilber ex O. Hilber 1997Pleurotus cystidiosus var. formosensis Moncalvo 1995Pleurotus cystidiosus (Y.H. Han, K.M. Chen & S. Cheng) O. Hilber 1993Antromycopsis macrocarpa (Ellis & Everh.) Stalpers, Seifert & Samson 1991Pleurotus abalonus Y.H. Han, K.M. Chen & S. Cheng 1974Pleurotus cystidiosus O.K. Mill. 1969Pleurotus cystidiosus var. cystidiosus O.K. Mill. 1969Antromycopsis broussonetiae Pat. & Trab. 1897Stilbum macrocarpum Ellis & Everh. 1886
}}Pleurotus cystidiosus, also known as abalone mushroom and maple oyster mushroom, is an edible species of fungus in the family Pleurotaceae, described as new to science by mycologist  Orson K. Miller Jr. in 1969. It can be cultivated, with spores and growing kits being available commercially. Antromycopsis macrocarpa (or A. broussonetiae'') is the anamorphic form of this species.

See also 
 List of Pleurotus species

References

External links 
 

Fungi described in 1969
Pleurotaceae